The grey wren-warbler (Calamonastes simplex) is a species of bird in the family Cisticolidae.
It is found in Angola, Burundi, Democratic Republic of the Congo, Ethiopia, Kenya, Malawi, Rwanda, Somalia, South Sudan, Tanzania, Uganda, and Zambia.
Its natural habitat is dry savanna.

The grey wren-warbler is a shy bird found in dense bush and undergrowth. It is normally found singly or in pairs and is a dark brownish-grey with inconspicuous barred markings. The tail is black and the eye red. It is more likely to be heard than seen though there may be an occasional glimpse of its tail which wags up and down as it forages. Its sharp call is rather like two stones striking each other.

References

grey wren-warbler
Birds of East Africa
grey wren-warbler
Taxonomy articles created by Polbot